Conor Brady (born 4 June 1998) in an Irish Gaelic footballer who plays for the Gowna club and the Cavan county team.

Playing career

Club
Brady joined the Gowna club and later progressed to the club's senior team.

On 7 November 2021, Brady started his first county final as Gowna faced Ramor United. A low-scoring game ended in a draw. Brady started the replay seven days later, a strong start from Ramor led to an eventual four-point win.

Gowna returned to the final the next year, where they faced Killygarry on October 16. Brady scored two points and Gowna claimed their first county championship since 2002.

Inter-county

Minor and under-20
On 19 July 2015, Brady was at midfield as the Cavan minor team faced Derry in the Ulster final. Derry came out on top on a 1-11 to 0-11 scoreline.

Brady later represented Cavan at under-20 level, but did not have success at this grade.

Senior
Brady joined the senior panel ahead of the 2018 season. 

On 27 January 2018, Brady made his National League debut as a late substitute against Clare. Brady was named on the bench for the Division 2 final against Roscommon, and didn't feature in the 4-16 to 4-12 loss.

On 18 May 2019, Brady scored a point on his championship debut in an Ulser quarter-final win over Monaghan. Brady was at midfield for the Ulster final against Donegal on 23 June. Brady scored a point as Donegal ran out five-point winners.

Brady did not feature in Cavan's 2020 Ulster final success through injury. On 5 December, Brady came on as a substitute in the All-Ireland semi-final as Cavan exited the championship to eventual champions Dublin.

Cavan faced Tipperary in the National League Division 4 final at Croke Park on 2 April 2022. Brady came on as a substitute in the 2–10 to 0-15 victory.

On 9 July 2022, Brady was at wing back as Cavan took on Westmeath in the inaugural Tailteann Cup decider at Croke Park. Westmeath went home with the cup after a four-point win.

Honours
Cavan
 Ulster Senior Football Championship (1): 2020
 National Football League Division 4 (1): 2022

Gowna
 Cavan Senior Football Championship (1): 2022

References

1998 births
Living people
Cavan inter-county Gaelic footballers
Gowna Gaelic footballers